Poland competed at the 1984 Winter Paralympics in Innsbruck, Austria. 16 competitors from Poland won 13 medals and finished 9th in the medal table.

Medalists

Gold
 Marian Niedzwiadek - Cross-country skiing, Standing 5 km Individual Classic LW3
 Marian Niedzwiadek - Cross-country skiing, Standing 10 km Individual Free LW3
 Barbara Chmielecka, Jolanta Kochanaowska, Henryka Sadowska - Cross-country skiing, Standing 3 x 5 km Relay LW2-9

Silver
 Kazimierz Wyszowski - Cross-country skiing, Standing 5 km Individual Classic LW3
 Kazimierz Wyszowski - Cross-country skiing, Standing 10 km Individual Free LW3

Bronze
 Elżbieta Dadok - Alpine skiing, Slalom LW6/8
 Elżbieta Dadok - Alpine skiing, Giant slalom LW6/8
 Elżbieta Dadok - Alpine skiing, Alpine Combination LW6/8
 Franciszek Tracz - Alpine skiing, Slalom LW3
 Barbara Chmielecka - Cross-country skiing, Standing 5 km Individual Classic LW6/8
 Barbara Chmielecka - Cross-country skiing, Standing 10 km Individual Free LW6/8
 Czesław Kwiatkowski - Cross-country skiing, Standing 5 km Individual Classic LW3
 Czesław Kwiatkowski - Cross-country skiing, Standing 10 km Individual Free LW3

Alpine skiing

Cross‑country skiing

See also 
 Poland at the Paralympics
 Poland at the 1984 Winter Olympics

References 

Poland at the Paralympics
1984 in Polish sport
Nations at the 1984 Winter Paralympics